Mark Stoeckinger is an American sound editor. He has over 80 film credits. In addition to 3 Oscar nominations, he has been nominated for the Motion Picture Sound Editors a total of 10 times, winning once with Gladiator.

Oscar Nominations
All of these are in Best Sound Editing.

70th Academy Awards-Nominated for Face/Off. Nomination shared with Per Hallberg. Lost to Titanic.
82nd Academy Awards-Nominated for Star Trek. Nomination shared with Alan Rankin. Lost to The Hurt Locker.
83rd Academy Awards-Nominated for Unstoppable. Lost to Inception.

References

External links

American sound editors
Living people
1959 births